Christ Appearing to Saint Anthony Abbot or The Temptation of Saint Anthony is a 1598-1600 oil on copper painting of Anthony the Great by Annibale Carracci. It was acquired in the 19th century by an English collector and bought in 1846 by the National Gallery, London, where it still hangs.

The saint's pose is heavily influenced by that of Adam in Michelangelo's Creation of Adam on the Sistine Chapel ceiling. The demons seem to draw on Flemish paintings of the saint's temptation, according to a compositional canon well-seen in a print by Antonio Tempesta.

It was recorded in the Borghese family collection in 1650 and Giovanni Pietro Bellori wrote it was worthy "of supreme praise", describing it in his 1672 Lives of the Artists as "the small copper [painting] in the Villa Borghese [of] Saint Anthony afflicted by monstrous demons, lying with his arms outstretched towards the Lord who appears to him to aid him".

References

paintings by Annibale Carracci
Collections of the National Gallery, London
1600 paintings
paintings of Anthony the Great